Das Schiff is a theatre in Hamburg, Germany.

Theatres in Hamburg
Buildings and structures in Hamburg-Mitte

1912 ships